David Fifita (born 28 June 1989) is a Tonga international rugby league footballer who plays as a  for The Entrance Tigers in the Central Coast Division Rugby League, after leaving Wakefield Trinity (Heritage № 1372) in 2022. 

He previously played for the Lezignan Sangliers in the Elite One Championship and the Cronulla-Sutherland Sharks in the NRL. He has spent time on loan from Wakefield at the Dewsbury Rams in the Championship.

Background
He was born in Blacktown, New South Wales, Australia.

He attended Patrician Brothers' College, Blacktown and Blacktown Boys High School.

Fifita is of Indigenous Australian and Tongan descent and played his junior rugby league for St Patricks Blacktown and Doonside Roos, before being signed by the Wests Tigers.

Fifita is the twin brother of fellow Cronulla-Sutherland Sharks player Andrew Fifita, and cousin of Gold Coast Titans  player David Fifita He is not related to John Fifita, a former St George Dragons player. Fifita's elder brother Latu Fifita plays for Workington Town in the Kingstone Press Championship.

Playing career

Early career
In 2009, Fifita played for the Wests Tigers' NYC team In 2010, he played for Tonga alongside his brother. In 2011, he moved on to the Tigers' New South Wales Cup teams, Balmain Ryde-Eastwood Tigers and Western Suburbs Magpies. At the end of 2012, he joined the Lézignan Sangliers in the Elite One Championship.

In June 2013, after finishing his season with Lézignan, he attracted the interest of NRL clubs, Cronulla-Sutherland Sharks and Melbourne Storm. 

He eventually signed a contract with the Sharks for the rest of the 2013 NRL season, the club where his twin brother Andrew played. After playing 6 games for the Sharks in the NSW Cup, he re-signed with them for 2014.

Fifita was a member of the 2013 NSW Cup premiership side which defeated Windsor Wolves 38-6 in the grand final.

2014
In Round 2 of the 2014 NRL season, Fifita made his NRL début for Cronulla-Sutherland against the Canterbury-Bankstown Bulldogs. On 17 July 2014, he re-signed with Cronulla-Sutherland on a two-year contract.

2015
On 13 February 2015, Fifita played for the Indigenous All Stars against the NRL All Stars in the 2015 All Stars match. In October, Fifita was selected in Tonga's 48-man train-on squad for the Asia-Pacific Qualifier for the 2017 Rugby League World Cup. He would go on to make the final 18-man squad where he would be named the 18th man and would fill in for any late injuries, suspensions or tactical changes. He would go on to play in that match, in what was only his second appearance for Tonga, after filling in for Leilani Latu.

2016
On 7 May, Fifita played for Tonga against Samoa in the 2016 Polynesian Cup. On 10 June, after gaining a release from Cronulla-Sutherland, he joined Wakefield Trinity in the Super League on a one-year contract, with an option for a second year, effective immediately.
Fifita turned into a big fans favourite at Wakefield Trinity due to his physical dominance in the middle of the park.

2017
Fifita made 21 appearances for Wakefield Trinity in the 2017 Super League season where the club shocked many by finishing fifth on the table.

2018
In the 2018 Super League season, Fifita made 17 appearances for Wakefield as the club finished 7th on the table.

2019
Fifita played 22 games for Wakefield in the 2019 Super League season where the club finished ninth on the table.

2020
On 28 August, Fifita was stood down by Wakefield after he refused to wear a GPS tracking device for coronavirus protocols.
Fifita played only nine games for Wakefield in the 2020 Super League season as the club finished second bottom.

2021
Fifita played 25 games for Wakefield Trinity in the 2021 Super League season which saw the club finish in 10th place.

2022
In round 18 of the 2022 Super League season, Fifita scored a try and was later sent to the sin bin during Wakefield's 38-26 loss against Toulouse Olympique at Magic Weekend.
After seven seasons at Wakefield Trinity, Fifita announced that he would be departing the club at the end of the year. Fifita's final game for Wakefield was a 16-14 loss against Huddersfield.

References

External links
Wakefield Trinity profile
Cronulla-Sutherland Sharks profile
SL profile

1989 births
Living people
Australian sportspeople of Tongan descent
Australian rugby league players
Australian expatriate sportspeople in England
Australian expatriate sportspeople in France
Balmain Ryde-Eastwood Tigers players
Combined Nationalities rugby league team players
Cronulla-Sutherland Sharks players
Dewsbury Rams players
David
Indigenous All Stars players
Indigenous Australian rugby league players
Lézignan Sangliers players
Rugby league players from Blacktown
Rugby league props
Tonga national rugby league team players
Tongan sportspeople
Australian twins
Twin sportspeople
Wakefield Trinity players
Western Suburbs Magpies NSW Cup players